Fakkeltog is the first album by Norwegian band Bridges, the band Paul Waaktaar-Savoy and Magne Furuholmen used to be in before meeting Morten Harket and becoming a-ha. Other members of the band are Viggo Bondi and Øystein Jevanord.
The album was produced in only 1000 copies.

Track listing

References

External links 
 

Bridges (band) albums
1980 debut albums